One Pound Only (also known as A Pound A Piece) is a 1964 Israeli black and white slapstick comedy directed by Yoram Gross.

Yoram Gross's success at the Israeli box office with this came after his first movie, Joseph the Dreamer.

Plot
Gidi "the tall" and Jako "the short", are two bums who colourfully paint the gray streets of Tel Aviv, trying to make some money and find a shelter.

Cast 

 Rachel Attas
 Ya'ackov Ben-Sira
 Shraga Friedman
 Michael Gur
 Gita Luka
 Bracha Ne'eman
 Shoshana Ravid
 Shmuel Rodensky
 Shmuel Segal
 Gideon Singer

References

External links

1964 films
Israeli black-and-white films
1964 animated films
Israeli animated films
Israeli comedy films
1964 comedy films
Films directed by Yoram Gross
1960s English-language films